This is a list of butterflies of Tanzania. About 1,583 species are known from Tanzania, 134 of which are endemic.

Papilionidae

Papilioninae

Papilionini
Papilio nireus nireus Linnaeus, 1758
Papilio nireus lyaeus Doubleday, 1845
Papilio chrapkowskoides Storace, 1952
Papilio desmondi magdae Gifford, 1961
Papilio desmondi usambaraensis (Koçak, 1980)
Papilio hornimani hornimani Distant, 1879
Papilio hornimani mbulu Kielland, 1990
Papilio hornimani mwanihanae Kielland, 1987
Papilio sosia debilis Storace, 1951
Papilio thuraui thuraui Karsch, 1900
Papilio thuraui cyclopis Rothschild & Jordan, 1903
Papilio thuraui ngorongoro (Hancock, 1984)
Papilio ufipa Carcasson, 1961 (endemic)
Papilio cynorta Fabricius, 1793
Papilio dardanus meseres Carpenter, 1948
Papilio dardanus tibullus Kirby, 1880
Papilio constantinus constantinus Ward, 1871
Papilio constantinus mweruanus Joicey & Talbot, 1927
Papilio phorcas ansorgei Rothschild, 1896
Papilio phorcas congoanus Rothschild, 1896
Papilio phorcas nyikanus Rothschild & Jordan, 1903
Papilio phorcas tenuifasciatus Kielland, 1990
Papilio rex rex Oberthür, 1886
Papilio rex mimeticus Rothschild, 1897
Papilio demodocus Esper, [1798]
Papilio echerioides ambangulu Clifton & Collins, 1997
Papilio echerioides homeyeri Plötz, 1880
Papilio echerioides joiceyi Gabriel, 1945
Papilio echerioides kiellandi Clifton & Collins, 1997
Papilio echerioides pseudowertheri Kielland, 1990
Papilio echerioides wertheri Karsch, 1898
Papilio fuelleborni fuelleborni Karsch, 1900
Papilio fuelleborni neocesa Kemal & Kocak, 2005
Papilio fuelleborni rydoni Kielland, 1987
Papilio fuelleborni sjoestedti Aurivillius, 1908
Papilio jacksoni kungwe Cottrell, 1963
Papilio nobilis nobilis Rogenhofer, 1891
Papilio nobilis crippsianus Stoneham, 1936
Papilio nobilis mpanda Kielland, 1990
Papilio hesperus Westwood, 1843
Papilio pelodurus vesper Le Cerf, 1924
Papilio lormieri semlikana Le Cerf, 1924
Papilio ophidicephalus ophidicephalus Oberthür, 1878
Papilio ophidicephalus mkuwadzi Gifford, 1961
Papilio mackinnoni mackinnoni Sharpe, 1891
Papilio mackinnoni isokae (Hancock, 1984)
Papilio mackinnoni mpwapwana Kielland, 1990
Papilio mackinnoni reductofascia Kielland, 1990

Leptocercini
Graphium antheus (Cramer, 1779)
Graphium policenes (Cramer, 1775)
Graphium kirbyi (Hewitson, 1872)
Graphium junodi (Trimen, 1893)
Graphium polistratus (Grose-Smith, 1889)
Graphium colonna (Ward, 1873)
Graphium illyris hamatus (Joicey & Talbot, 1918)
Graphium porthaon porthaon (Hewitson, 1865)
Graphium porthaon tanganyikae Kielland, 1978
Graphium angolanus angolanus (Goeze, 1779)
Graphium angolanus baronis (Ungemach, 1932)
Graphium taboranus (Oberthür, 1886)
Graphium ridleyanus (White, 1843)
Graphium leonidas leonidas (Fabricius, 1793)
Graphium leonidas pelopidas (Oberthür, 1879)
Graphium tynderaeus (Fabricius, 1793)
Graphium latreillianus theorini (Aurivillius, 1881)
Graphium philonoe (Ward, 1873)
Graphium almansor uganda (Lathy, 1906)
Graphium kigoma Carcasson, 1964 (endemic)
Graphium ucalegon schoutedeni Berger, 1950

Pieridae

Coliadinae
Eurema brigitta (Stoll, [1780])
Eurema mandarinula (Holland, 1892)
Eurema floricola floricola (Boisduval, 1833)
Eurema floricola leonis (Butler, 1886)
Eurema hapale (Mabille, 1882)
Eurema hecabe solifera (Butler, 1875)
Eurema senegalensis (Boisduval, 1836)
Catopsilia florella (Fabricius, 1775)
Colias electo pseudohecate Berger, 1940

Pierinae
Colotis antevippe gavisa (Wallengren, 1857)
Colotis aurigineus (Butler, 1883)
Colotis aurora evarne (Klug, 1829)
Colotis auxo (Lucas, 1852)
Colotis celimene (Lucas, 1852)
Colotis chrysonome (Klug, 1829)
Colotis daira jacksoni (Sharpe, 1890)
Colotis danae pseudacaste (Butler, 1876)
Colotis dissociatus (Butler, 1897)
Colotis elgonensis elgonensis (Sharpe, 1891)
Colotis elgonensis nobilis Carcasson, 1961
Colotis euippe complexivus (Butler, 1886)
Colotis euippe omphale (Godart, 1819)
Colotis eunoma flotowi (Suffert, 1904)
Colotis evenina casta (Gerstaecker, 1871)
Colotis evenina sipylus (Swinhoe, 1884)
Colotis evenina xantholeuca (Sharpe, 1904)
Colotis halimede australis Talbot, 1939
Colotis hetaera hetaera (Gerstaecker, 1871)
Colotis hetaera ankolensis Stoneham, 1940
Colotis hildebrandtii (Staudinger, 1884)
Colotis incretus (Butler, 1881)
Colotis ione (Godart, 1819)
Colotis pallene (Hopffer, 1855)
Colotis protomedia (Klug, 1829)
Colotis regina (Trimen, 1863)
Colotis venosa (Staudinger, 1885)
Colotis vesta catachrysops (Butler, 1878)
Colotis vesta hanningtoni (Butler, 1883)
Colotis vesta kagera Congdon, Kielland & Collins, 1998
Colotis vesta rhodesinus (Butler, 1894)
Colotis vestalis castalis (Staudinger, 1884)
Colotis subfasciatus ducissa (Dognin, 1891)
Eronia cleodora cleodora Hübner, 1823
Eronia cleodora dilatata Butler, 1888
Pinacopterix eriphia eriphia (Godart, [1819])
Pinacopterix eriphia melanarge (Butler, 1886)
Pinacopterix eriphia wittei Berger, 1940
Nepheronia argia argolisia (Stoneham, 1957)
Nepheronia argia mhondana (Suffert, 1904)
Nepheronia buquetii (Boisduval, 1836)
Nepheronia pharis silvanus (Stoneham, 1957)
Nepheronia thalassina sinalata (Suffert, 1904)
Leptosia alcesta inalcesta Bernardi, 1959
Leptosia hybrida somereni Bernardi, 1959
Leptosia marginea (Mabille, 1890)
Leptosia nupta pseudonupta Bernardi, 1959
Leptosia wigginsi (Dixey, 1915)

Pierini
Appias epaphia contracta (Butler, 1888)
Appias lasti (Grose-Smith, 1889)
Appias phaola intermedia Dufrane, 1948
Appias phaola isokani (Grose-Smith, 1889)
Appias sabina sabina (Felder & Felder, [1865])
Appias sabina phoebe (Butler, 1901)
Appias sylvia nyasana (Butler, 1897)
Pieris brassicoides marghanita Hemming, 1941
Pontia distorta (Butler, 1886)
Pontia helice johnstonii (Crowley, 1887)
Mylothris agathina (Cramer, 1779)
Mylothris asphodelus Butler, 1888
Mylothris basalis Aurivillius, 1906
Mylothris chloris (Fabricius, 1775)
Mylothris citrina Aurivillius, 1898
Mylothris continua Talbot, 1944
Mylothris crawshayi bunduki Berger, 1980
Mylothris ertli Suffert, 1904 (endemic)
Mylothris flaviana interposita Joicey & Talbot, 1921
Mylothris jacksoni Sharpe, 1891
Mylothris kiellandi Berger, 1985 (endemic)
Mylothris kilimensis kilimensis Kielland, 1990
Mylothris kilimensis rondonis Kielland, 1990
Mylothris kiwuensis rhodopoides Talbot, 1944
Mylothris leonora Krüger, 1928 (endemic)
Mylothris pluviata Berger, 1980 (endemic)
Mylothris rhodope (Fabricius, 1775)
Mylothris rubricosta rubricosta (Mabille, 1890)
Mylothris rubricosta attenuata Talbot, 1944
Mylothris rubricosta pulchra Berger, 1981
Mylothris rueppellii rhodesiana Riley, 1921
Mylothris rueppellii tirikensis Neave, 1904
Mylothris sagala sagala Grose-Smith, 1886
Mylothris sagala albissima Talbot, 1944
Mylothris sagala dentatus Butler, 1896
Mylothris sagala mahale Kielland, 1990
Mylothris sagala narcissus Butler, 1888
Mylothris sagala oldeanensis Kielland, 1990
Mylothris sagala seminigra d'Abrera, 1980
Mylothris schumanni uniformis Talbot, 1944
Mylothris similis similis Lathy, 1906
Mylothris similis dollmani Riley, 1921
Mylothris sjostedti hecqui Berger, 1952
Mylothris superbus Kielland, 1985 (endemic)
Mylothris talboti Berger, 1980 (endemic)
Mylothris yulei yulei Butler, 1897
Mylothris yulei latimargo Joicey & Talbot, 1921
Dixeia charina dagera (Suffert, 1904)
Dixeia charina liliana (Grose-Smith, 1889)
Dixeia dixeyi (Neave, 1904)
Dixeia doxo alberta (Grünberg, 1912)
Dixeia doxo costata Talbot, 1943
Dixeia orbona vidua (Butler, 1900)
Dixeia pigea (Boisduval, 1836)
Dixeia spilleri (Spiller, 1884)
Belenois aurota (Fabricius, 1793)
Belenois calypso minor Talbot, 1943
Belenois calypso crawshayi Butler, 1894
Belenois creona severina (Stoll, 1781)
Belenois diminuta Butler, 1894
Belenois margaritacea intermedia Kielland, 1982
Belenois margaritacea plutonica (Joicey & Talbot, 1927)
Belenois raffrayi extendens (Joicey & Talbot, 1927)
Belenois raffrayi similis Kielland, 1978
Belenois rubrosignata kongwana Talbot, 1943
Belenois solilucis loveni (Aurivillius, 1921)
Belenois subeida sylvander Grose-Smith, 1890
Belenois sudanensis pseudodentigera Berger, 1981
Belenois theora laeta (Weymer, 1903)
Belenois thysa thysa (Hopffer, 1855)
Belenois thysa meldolae Butler, 1872
Belenois victoria schoutedeni Berger, 1953
Belenois welwitschii shaba Berger, 1981
Belenois zochalia agrippinides (Holland, 1896)

Lycaenidae

Miletinae

Liphyrini
Euliphyra leucyania (Hewitson, 1874)
Aslauga abri Collins & Libert, 1997 (endemic)
Aslauga bouyeri congdoni Libert & Collins, 1997
Aslauga latifurca Cottrell, 1981
Aslauga marshalli Butler, 1899
Aslauga orientalis Cottrell, 1981
Aslauga prouvosti Libert & Bouyer, 1997
Aslauga purpurascens Holland, 1890
Aslauga tanga Libert & Collins, 1997 (endemic)
Aslauga vininga kiellandi Libert, 1997

Miletini
Megalopalpus zymna (Westwood, 1851)
Spalgis jacksoni stempfferi Kielland, 1985
Lachnocnema bibulus (Fabricius, 1793)
Lachnocnema laches (Fabricius, 1793)
Lachnocnema pseudobibulus Libert, 1996
Lachnocnema sosia Libert, 1996
Lachnocnema kiellandi Libert, 1996 (endemic)
Lachnocnema durbani Trimen & Bowker, 1887
Lachnocnema tanzaniensis Libert, 1996 (endemic)
Lachnocnema jacksoni Stempffer, 1967
Lachnocnema regularis grisea Libert, 1996
Lachnocnema brimoides Libert, 1996
Lachnocnema divergens Gaede, 1915
Lachnocnema vuattouxi Libert, 1996
Lachnocnema dohertyi Libert, 1996
Lachnocnema luna Druce, 1910
Lachnocnema brunea Libert, 1996
Lachnocnema exiguus Holland, 1890
Lachnocnema inexpectata Libert, 1996 (endemic)
Lachnocnema unicolor Libert, 1996 (endemic)

Poritiinae

Liptenini
Alaena amazoula nyasana Hawker-Smith, 1933
Alaena bicolora Bethune-Baker, 1924 (endemic)
Alaena bjornstadi Kielland, 1993 (endemic)
Alaena caissa caissa Rebel & Rogenhofer, 1894
Alaena caissa kagera Talbot, 1935
Alaena dodomaensis Kielland, 1983
Alaena ferrulineata Hawker-Smith, 1933 (endemic)
Alaena interposita interposita Butler, 1883 (endemic)
Alaena interposita hauttecoeuri Oberthür, 1888 (endemic)
Alaena johanna Sharpe, 1890
Alaena kiellandi Carcasson, 1965 (endemic)
Alaena madibirensis Wichgraf, 1921 (endemic)
Alaena ngonga Jackson, 1966
Alaena nyassa nyassa Hewitson, 1877
Alaena nyassa major Oberthür, 1888
Alaena picata Sharpe, 1896
Alaena reticulata Butler, 1896
Alaena unimaculosa aurantiaca Butler, 1895
Ptelina carnuta (Hewitson, 1873)
Pentila alba Dewitz, 1886
Pentila cloetensi albida Hawker-Smith, 1933
Pentila inconspicua Druce, 1910
Pentila pauli alberta Hulstaert, 1924
Pentila pauli clarensis Neave, 1903
Pentila pauli dama (Suffert, 1904)
Pentila pauli nyassana Aurivillius, 1899
Pentila rogersi rogersi (Druce, 1907)
Pentila rogersi parapetreia Rebel, 1908
Pentila rondo Kielland, 1990 (endemic)
Pentila tachyroides Dewitz, 1879
Pentila tropicalis mombasae (Grose-Smith & Kirby, 1889)
Pentila umangiana connectens Hulstaert, 1924
Pentila umangiana mpanda Congdon, Kielland & Collins, 1998
Telipna sanguinea depuncta Talbot, 1937
Telipna kigoma Kielland, 1978 (endemic)
Telipna consanguinea ugandae Behune-Baker, 1926
Ornipholidotos ugandae Stempffer, 1947
Ornipholidotos teroensis Stempffer, 1957
Ornipholidotos katangae reducta Libert, 2005
Ornipholidotos amieti angulata Libert, 2005
Ornipholidotos overlaeti intermedia Libert, 2005
Ornipholidotos gemina fournierae Libert, 2005
Ornipholidotos jacksoni Stempffer, 1961
Ornipholidotos ntebi (Bethune-Baker, 1906)
Ornipholidotos latimargo (Hawker-Smith, 1933)
Ornipholidotos tanganyikae Kielland, 1983 (endemic)
Ornipholidotos emarginata maxima Libert, 2005
Ornipholidotos paradoxa orientis Libert, 2005
Ornipholidotos nguru Kielland, 1987 (endemic)
Ornipholidotos peucetia peucetia (Hewitson, 1866)
Ornipholidotos peucetia peuceda (Grose-Smith, 1889)
Cooksonia neavei (Druce, 1912)
Mimacraea gelinia gelinia (Oberthür, 1893) (endemic)
Mimacraea gelinia nguru Kielland, 1986 (endemic)
Mimacraea krausei poultoni Neave, 1904
Mimacraea landbecki Druce, 1910
Mimacraea marginata Libert & Collins, 2000 (endemic)
Mimacraea marshalli marshalli Trimen, 1898
Mimacraea marshalli dohertyi Rothschild, 1901
Mimacraea eltringhami Druce, 1912
Mimacraea skoptoles Druce, 1907
Mimeresia dinora discirubra (Talbot, 1937)
Mimeresia neavei (Joicey & Talbot, 1921)
Liptena amabilis nyanzae Congdon, Kielland & Collins, 1998
Liptena despecta (Holland, 1890)
Liptena eukrines Druce, 1905
Liptena eukrinoides Talbot, 1937
Liptena minziro Collins & Larsen, 2008
Liptena flavicans katera Stempffer, 1956
Liptena hapale Talbot, 1935
Liptena homeyeri Dewitz, 1884
Liptena kiellandi Congdon & Collins, 1998
Liptena modesta (Kirby, 1890)
Liptena nigromarginata Stempffer, 1961
Liptena opaca ugandana Stempffer, Bennett & May, 1974
Liptena orubrum teroana Talbot, 1935
Liptena praestans congoensis Schultze, 1923
Liptena rubromacula jacksoni Carpenter, 1934
Liptena turbata (Kirby, 1890)
Liptena xanthostola xantha (Grose-Smith, 1901)
Kakumia ideoides (Dewitz, 1887)
Tetrarhanis ilma daltoni (Poulton, 1929)
Tetrarhanis ilma lathyi (Joicey & Talbot, 1921)
Tetrarhanis ilma ugandae (Stempffer, 1964)
Falcuna orientalis (Bethune-Baker, 1906)
Larinopoda tera (Hewitson, 1873)
Micropentila bunyoro Stempffer & Bennett, 1965
Micropentila cherereti Stempffer & Bennett, 1965
Micropentila jacksoni Talbot, 1937
Micropentila katerae Stempffer & Bennett, 1965
Micropentila mpigi Stempffer & Bennett, 1965
Micropentila ugandae Hawker-Smith, 1933
Micropentila victoriae Stempffer & Bennett, 1965
Pseuderesia eleaza katera Stempffer, 1961
Pseuderesia mapongua (Holland, 1893)
Eresina bergeri Stempffer, 1956
Eresina bilinea Talbot, 1935
Eresina conradti Stempffer, 1956
Eresina fontainei Stempffer, 1956
Eresina katera Stempffer, 1962
Eresina masaka Stempffer, 1962
Eresina rougeoti Stempffer, 1956
Eresiomera kiellandi Larsen, 1998 (endemic)
Eresiomera rougeoti (Stempffer, 1961)
Citrinophila erastus pallida Hawker-Smith, 1933
Citrinophila unipunctata Bethune-Baker, 1908
Argyrocheila inundifera Hawker-Smith, 1933
Argyrocheila ugandae Hawker-Smith, 1933
Teriomima subpunctata Kirby, 1887
Teriomima puella Kirby, 1887
Teriomima micra (Grose-Smith, 1898)
Teriomima parva parva Hawker-Smith, 1933
Teriomima parva beylissi Henning & Henning, 2004
Euthecta cooksoni subgrisea Henning & Henning, 2004
Euthecta cooksoni marginata Henning & Henning, 2004
Euthecta cordeiroi Henning & Henning, 2004 (endemic)
Baliochila neavei Stempffer & Bennett, 1953
Baliochila hildegarda (Kirby, 1887)
Baliochila dubiosa Stempffer & Bennett, 1953
Baliochila amanica Stempffer & Bennett, 1953
Baliochila latimarginata latimarginata (Hawker-Smith, 1933)
Baliochila latimarginata rondoensis Henning & Henning, 2004
Baliochila lipara Stempffer & Bennett, 1953
Baliochila congdoni Kielland, 1990 (endemic)
Baliochila warrengashi Collins & Larsen, 1996 (endemic)
Baliochila lequeuxi Kielland, 1994 (endemic)
Baliochila collinsi Henning & Henning, 2004 (endemic)
Baliochila megadentata Henning & Henning, 2004 (endemic)
Baliochila nguru Kielland, 1986 (endemic)
Baliochila citrina Henning & Henning, 2004 (endemic)
Baliochila abri Henning & Henning, 2004 (endemic)
Baliochila fragilis Stempffer & Bennett, 1953
Baliochila pseudofragilis Kielland, 1976 (endemic)
Baliochila stygia Stempffer & Bennett, 1953
Baliochila fusca Henning & Henning, 2004 (endemic)
Baliochila mwanihanae Congdon, Kielland & Collins, 1998 (endemic)
Baliochila pringlei Stempffer, 1967 (endemic)
Cnodontes vansomereni Stempffer & Bennett, 1953
Congdonia duplex Henning & Henning, 2004 (endemic)
Eresinopsides bichroma Strand, 1911
Eresinopsides bamptoni Henning & Henning, 2004 (endemic)

Epitolini
Toxochitona gerda (Kirby, 1890)
Iridana hypocala Eltringham, 1929
Iridana jacksoni Stempffer, 1964
Iridana katera Stempffer, 1964
Iridana marina Talbot, 1935
Iridana unyoro Stempffer, 1964
Teratoneura congoensis Stempffer, 1954
Cerautola ceraunia (Hewitson, 1873)
Cerautola crowleyi congdoni Libert & Collins, 1999
Cerautola miranda vidua (Talbot, 1935)
Cerautola semibrunnea bamptoni Libert & Collins, 1999
Geritola gerina (Hewitson, 1878)
Geritola goodii (Holland, 1890)
Geritola liana (Roche, 1954)
Geritola subargentea (Jackson, 1964)
Stempfferia cercene (Hewitson, 1873)
Stempfferia cercenoides (Holland, 1890)
Stempfferia insulana (Aurivillius, 1923)
Stempfferia mara (Talbot, 1935)
Cephetola cephena entebbeana (Bethune-Baker, 1926)
Cephetola eliasis (Kielland & Congdon, 1998)
Cephetola gerdae (Kielland & Libert, 1998) (endemic)
Cephetola izidori (Kielland & Congdon, 1998)
Cephetola kamengensis (Jackson, 1962)
Cephetola katerae (Jackson, 1962)
Cephetola kiellandi (Libert & Congdon, 1998)
Cephetola mariae Libert, 1999
Cephetola martini (Libert, 1998)
Cephetola mpangensis (Jackson, 1962)
Cephetola orientalis (Roche, 1954)
Cephetola peteri (Kielland & Congdon, 1998)
Cephetola pinodes budduana (Talbot, 1937)
Cephetola subgriseata (Jackson, 1964)
Cephetola sublustris (Bethune-Baker, 1904)
Cephetola tanzaniensis Libert, 1999 (endemic)
Cephetola vinalli (Talbot, 1935)
Cephetola viridana (Joicey & Talbot, 1921)
Deloneura abri Congdon & Collins, 1998 (endemic)
Deloneura ochrascens littoralis Talbot, 1935
Deloneura subfusca Hawker-Smith, 1933
Neaveia lamborni orientalis Jackson, 1962
Epitolina dispar (Kirby, 1887)
Epitolina melissa (Druce, 1888)
Epitolina catori ugandae Jackson, 1962
Hypophytala benitensis minziro Libert & Collins, 1999
Hypophytala vansomereni (Jackson, 1964)
Hewitsonia inexpectata Bouyer, 1997
Hewitsonia kuehnei Collins & Larsen, 2008
Hewitsonia intermedia Jackson, 1962

Aphnaeinae
Pseudaletis agrippina Druce, 1888
Pseudaletis busoga van Someren, 1939
Pseudaletis antimachus (Staudinger, 1888)
Lipaphnaeus aderna pan (Talbot, 1935)
Lipaphnaeus aderna spindasoides (Aurivillius, 1916)
Lipaphnaeus eustorgia (Hulstaert, 1924)
Lipaphnaeus leonina paradoxa (Schultze, 1908)
Lipaphnaeus leonina loxura (Rebel, 1914)
Chloroselas azurea Butler, 1900
Chloroselas esmeralda Butler, 1886
Chloroselas minima Jackson, 1966
Chloroselas overlaeti Stempffer, 1956
Chloroselas pseudozeritis (Trimen, 1873)
Vansomerenia rogersi (Riley, 1932)
Crudaria leroma (Wallengren, 1857)
Cigaritis apelles (Oberthür, 1878)
Cigaritis brunnea (Jackson, 1966)
Cigaritis collinsi (Kielland, 1980) (endemic)
Cigaritis crustaria (Holland, 1890)
Cigaritis ella (Hewitson, 1865)
Cigaritis homeyeri (Dewitz, 1887)
Cigaritis nairobiensis (Sharpe, 1904)
Cigaritis nyassae (Butler, 1884)
Cigaritis tanganyikae (Kielland, 1990) (endemic)
Cigaritis tavetensis (Lathy, 1906)
Cigaritis trimeni (Neave, 1910)
Cigaritis victoriae (Butler, 1884)
Axiocerses harpax ugandana Clench, 1963
Axiocerses tjoane (Wallengren, 1857)
Axiocerses bambana Grose-Smith, 1900
Axiocerses coalescens Henning & Henning, 1996
Axiocerses styx Rebel, 1908 (endemic)
Axiocerses kiellandi Henning & Henning, 1996 (endemic)
Axiocerses amanga (Westwood, 1881)
Axiocerses punicea (Grose-Smith, 1889)
Aloeides conradsi conradsi (Aurivillius, 1907)
Aloeides conradsi angoniensis Tite & Dickson, 1973
Aloeides conradsi talboti Tite & Dickson, 1973
Aloeides molomo kiellandi Carcasson, 1961
Aphnaeus argyrocyclus Holland, 1890
Aphnaeus erikssoni kiellandi Stempffer, 1972
Aphnaeus erikssoni rex Aurivillius, 1909
Aphnaeus hutchinsonii Trimen & Bowker, 1887
Aphnaeus jefferyi Hawker-Smith, 1928
Aphnaeus marshalli Neave, 1910
Aphnaeus orcas (Drury, 1782)

Theclinae
Myrina dermaptera nyassae Talbot, 1935
Myrina sharpei Bethune-Baker, 1906
Myrina silenus ficedula Trimen, 1879
Hypolycaena amanica Stempffer, 1951 (endemic)
Hypolycaena antifaunus latimacula (Joicey & Talbot, 1921)
Hypolycaena auricostalis auricostalis (Butler, 1897)
Hypolycaena auricostalis frommi Strand, 1911
Hypolycaena buxtoni rogersi Bethune-Baker, 1924
Hypolycaena buxtoni spurcus Talbot, 1929
Hypolycaena hatita japhusa Riley, 1921
Hypolycaena hatita ugandae Sharpe, 1904
Hypolycaena kadiskos Druce, 1890
Hypolycaena lebona davenporti Larsen, 1997
Hypolycaena liara liara Druce, 1890
Hypolycaena liara plana Talbot, 1935
Hypolycaena obscura Stempffer, 1947
Hypolycaena nigra Bethune-Baker, 1914
Hypolycaena pachalica Butler, 1888
Hemiolaus caeculus caeculus (Hopffer, 1855)
Hemiolaus caeculus littoralis Stempffer, 1954
Hemiolaus caeculus vividus Pinhey, 1962
Leptomyrina gorgias sobrina Talbot, 1935
Iolaus alienus Trimen, 1898
Iolaus apatosa (Stempffer, 1952)
Iolaus bamptoni (Congdon & Collins, 1998) (endemic)
Iolaus bellina exquisita (Riley, 1928)
Iolaus congdoni (Kielland, 1985)
Iolaus diametra diametra (Karsch, 1895)
Iolaus diametra littoralis (Congdon & Collins, 1998)
Iolaus diametra zanzibarensis (Congdon & Collins, 1998)
Iolaus dubiosa (Stempffer & Bennett, 1959)
Iolaus farquharsoni (Bethune-Baker, 1922)
Iolaus fontainei (Stempffer, 1956)
Iolaus frater (Joicey & Talbot, 1921)
Iolaus hemicyanus Sharpe, 1904
Iolaus jacksoni (Stempffer, 1950)
Iolaus mermis (Druce, 1896)
Iolaus mimosae rhodosense (Stempffer & Bennett, 1959)
Iolaus nasisii (Riley, 1928)
Iolaus neavei katera Talbot, 1937
Iolaus nolaensis amanica (Stempffer, 1951)
Iolaus sidus Trimen, 1864
Iolaus silanus silanus Grose-Smith, 1889
Iolaus silanus alticola (Stempffer, 1961)
Iolaus silanus rondo (Congdon & Collins, 1998)
Iolaus silanus zanzibarica (Congdon & Collins, 1998)
Iolaus stenogrammica (Riley, 1928)
Iolaus tajoraca ertli Aurivillius, 1916
Iolaus violacea (Riley, 1928)
Iolaus trimeni Wallengren, 1875
Iolaus henryi (Stempffer, 1961)
Iolaus jamesoni (Druce, 1891)
Iolaus parasilanus parasilanus Rebel, 1914
Iolaus parasilanus divaricatus (Riley, 1928)
Iolaus poecilaon (Riley, 1928)
Iolaus aequatorialis (Stempffer & Bennett, 1958)
Iolaus cottrelli (Stempffer & Bennett, 1958)
Iolaus crawshayi littoralis (Stempffer & Bennett, 1958)
Iolaus iturensis (Joicey & Talbot, 1921)
Iolaus lalos (Druce, 1896)
Iolaus maritimus usambara (Stempffer, 1961)
Iolaus montana (Kielland, 1978) (endemic)
Iolaus ndolae (Stempffer & Bennett, 1958)
Iolaus pamae Heath, 1994
Iolaus silarus Druce, 1885
Iolaus timon orientius Hulstaert, 1924
Iolaus catori cottoni Bethune-Baker, 1908
Etesiolaus pinheyi (Kielland, 1986) (endemic)
Stugeta bowkeri maria Suffert, 1904
Stugeta bowkeri mombasae Butler, 1901
Stugeta bowkeri nyasana Talbot, 1935
Stugeta mimetica Aurivillius, 1916 (endemic)
Pilodeudorix mimeta angusta Libert, 2004
Pilodeudorix baginei (Collins & Larsen, 1991)
Pilodeudorix anetia (Hulstaert, 1924)
Pilodeudorix bemba (Neave, 1910)
Pilodeudorix canescens (Joicey & Talbot, 1921)
Pilodeudorix infuscata (Stempffer, 1964)
Pilodeudorix kafuensis (Neave, 1910)
Pilodeudorix mera kinumbensis (Dufrane, 1945)
Pilodeudorix nyanzana (Stempffer, 1957)
Pilodeudorix otraeda genuba (Hewitson, 1875)
Pilodeudorix caerulea (Druce, 1890)
Pilodeudorix obscurata (Trimen, 1891)
Pilodeudorix camerona katanga (Clench, 1965)
Pilodeudorix congoana orientalis (Stempffer, 1957)
Pilodeudorix kohli (Aurivillius, 1921)
Pilodeudorix rodgersi Kielland, 1985 (endemic)
Pilodeudorix zela (Hewitson, 1869)
Pilodeudorix zeloides (Butler, 1901)
Pilodeudorix hugoi Libert, 2004
Pilodeudorix corruscans (Aurivillius, 1898)
Pilodeudorix kiellandi (Congdon & Collins, 1998)
Pilodeudorix violetta (Aurivillius, 1897)
Paradeudorix ituri ugandae (Talbot, 1935)
Paradeudorix marginata (Stempffer, 1962)
Hypomyrina nomenia extensa Libert, 2004
Deudorix caliginosa Lathy, 1903
Deudorix dariaves Hewitson, 1877
Deudorix dinochares Grose-Smith, 1887
Deudorix dinomenes dinomenes Grose-Smith, 1887
Deudorix dinomenes diomedes Jackson, 1966
Deudorix diocles Hewitson, 1869
Deudorix ecaudata Gifford, 1963
Deudorix jacksoni Talbot, 1935
Deudorix livia (Klug, 1834)
Deudorix lorisona lorisona (Hewitson, 1862)
Deudorix lorisona coffea Jackson, 1966
Deudorix lorisona baronica Ungemach, 1932
Deudorix montana (Kielland, 1985)
Deudorix mpanda (Kielland, 1990) (endemic)
Deudorix odana Druce, 1887
Deudorix penningtoni van Son, 1949
Deudorix ufipa Kielland, 1978
Deudorix vansomereni Stempffer, 1951
Capys brunneus Aurivillius, 1916
Capys catharus Riley, 1932
Capys connexivus Butler, 1897
Capys usambarae Congdon & Collins, 1998 (endemic)

Polyommatinae

Lycaenesthini
Anthene afra (Bethune-Baker, 1910)
Anthene alberta (Bethune-Baker, 1910)
Anthene butleri stempfferi Storace, 1954
Anthene chirinda (Bethune-Baker, 1910)
Anthene contrastata mashuna (Stevenson, 1937)
Anthene crawshayi (Butler, 1899)
Anthene definita (Butler, 1899)
Anthene hobleyi ufipa Kielland, 1990
Anthene indefinita (Bethune-Baker, 1910)
Anthene irumu (Stempffer, 1948)
Anthene katera Talbot, 1937
Anthene kersteni (Gerstaecker, 1871)
Anthene lasti (Grose-Smith & Kirby, 1894)
Anthene lemnos loa (Strand, 1911)
Anthene leptala (Courvoisier, 1914) (endemic)
Anthene ligures (Hewitson, 1874)
Anthene liodes (Hewitson, 1874)
Anthene madibirensis (Wichgraf, 1921) (endemic)
Anthene minima (Trimen, 1893)
Anthene montana Kielland, 1990 (endemic)
Anthene mpanda Kielland, 1990
Anthene nigropunctata (Bethune-Baker, 1910)
Anthene opalina Stempffer, 1946
Anthene otacilia (Trimen, 1868)
Anthene kikuyu (Bethune-Baker, 1910)
Anthene rubricinctus anadema (Druce, 1905)
Anthene rubricinctus jeanneli Stempffer, 1961
Anthene rubrimaculata rubrimaculata (Strand, 1909) (endemic)
Anthene rubrimaculata tukuyu Kielland, 1990 (endemic)
Anthene rubrimaculata zanzibarica Congdon & Collins, 1998 (endemic)
Anthene schoutedeni (Hulstaert, 1924)
Anthene sylvanus albicans (Grünberg, 1910)
Anthene talboti Stempffer, 1936
Anthene ukerewensis (Strand, 1909) (endemic)
Anthene uzungwae Kielland, 1990 (endemic)
Anthene wilsoni (Talbot, 1935)
Anthene kalinzu (Stempffer, 1950)
Anthene chryseostictus (Bethune-Baker, 1910)
Anthene gemmifera (Neave, 1910)
Anthene lusones (Hewitson, 1874)
Anthene staudingeri (Grose-Smith & Kirby, 1894)
Anthene hades (Bethune-Baker, 1910)
Anthene inconspicua (Druce, 1910)
Anthene kamilila (Bethune-Baker, 1910)
Anthene kimboza (Kielland, 1990)
Anthene lamias katerae (d'Abrera, 1980)
Anthene nigeriae (Aurivillius, 1905)
Anthene oculatus (Grose-Smith & Kirby, 1893)
Cupidesthes arescopa orientalis (Stempffer, 1962)
Cupidesthes eliasi Congdon, Kielland & Collins, 1998
Cupidesthes leonina (Bethune-Baker, 1903)
Cupidesthes ysobelae Jackson, 1966
Lycaena phlaeas abbottii (Holland, 1892)
Lycaena phlaeas ethiopica (Poulton, 1922)

Polyommatini
Cupidopsis jobates (Hopffer, 1855)
Pseudonacaduba aethiops (Mabille, 1877)
Pseudonacaduba sichela (Wallengren, 1857)
Uranothauma antinorii felthami (Stevenson, 1934)
Uranothauma confusa Kielland, 1989
Uranothauma cordatus (Sharpe, 1892)
Uranothauma crawshayi Butler, 1895
Uranothauma cuneatum Tite, 1958
Uranothauma delatorum Heron, 1909
Uranothauma falkensteini (Dewitz, 1879)
Uranothauma heritsia chibonotana (Aurivillius, 1910)
Uranothauma heritsia intermedia (Tite, 1958)
Uranothauma heritsia virgo (Butler, 1896)
Uranothauma kilimensis Kielland, 1985 (endemic)
Uranothauma lukwangule Kielland, 1987 (endemic)
Uranothauma lunifer (Rebel, 1914)
Uranothauma nguru Kielland, 1985 (endemic)
Uranothauma nubifer (Trimen, 1895)
Uranothauma poggei (Dewitz, 1879)
Uranothauma uganda Kielland, 1980
Uranothauma usambarae Kielland, 1980 (endemic)
Uranothauma vansomereni Stempffer, 1951
Uranothauma williamsi Carcasson, 1961
Phlyaria cyara tenuimarginata (Grünberg, 1908)
Cacyreus audeoudi Stempffer, 1936
Cacyreus tespis (Herbst, 1804)
Cacyreus virilis Stempffer, 1936
Harpendyreus aequatorialis vulcanica (Joicey & Talbot, 1924)
Harpendyreus berger Stempffer, 1976 (endemic)
Harpendyreus boma (Bethune-Baker, 1926) (endemic)
Harpendyreus juno (Butler, 1897)
Harpendyreus major (Joicey & Talbot, 1924)
Harpendyreus marungensis marungensis (Joicey & Talbot, 1924)
Harpendyreus marungensis mangalisae Kielland, 1986
Harpendyreus meruana (Aurivillius, 1910) (endemic)
Leptotes brevidentatus (Tite, 1958)
Leptotes marginalis (Stempffer, 1944)
Tuxentius calice calice (Hopffer, 1855)
Tuxentius calice gregorii (Butler, 1894)
Tuxentius ertli (Aurivillius, 1907)
Tuxentius margaritaceus (Sharpe, 1892)
Tuxentius melaena (Trimen & Bowker, 1887)
Tuxentius stempfferi (Kielland, 1976) (endemic)
Tarucus grammicus (Grose-Smith & Kirby, 1893)
Zintha hintza (Trimen, 1864)
Actizera stellata (Trimen, 1883)
Azanus isis (Drury, 1773)
Eicochrysops distractus (de Joannis & Verity, 1913)
Eicochrysops eicotrochilus Bethune-Baker, 1924
Eicochrysops hippocrates (Fabricius, 1793)
Eicochrysops masai (Bethune-Baker, 1905)
Eicochrysops messapus mahallakoaena (Wallengren, 1857)
Eicochrysops rogersi Bethune-Baker, 1924
Euchrysops albistriata (Capronnier, 1889)
Euchrysops barkeri (Trimen, 1893)
Euchrysops crawshayi crawshayi (Butler, 1899)
Euchrysops crawshayi fontainei Stempffer, 1967
Euchrysops kabrosae rosieae Congdon, Kielland & Collins, 1998
Euchrysops mauensis Bethune-Baker, 1923
Euchrysops nandensis (Neave, 1904)
Euchrysops severini Hulstaert, 1924
Euchrysops subpallida Bethune-Baker, 1923
Thermoniphas distincta (Talbot, 1935)
Thermoniphas fontainei Stempffer, 1956
Thermoniphas colorata (Ungemach, 1932)
Thermoniphas plurilimbata Karsch, 1895
Oboronia bueronica Karsch, 1895
Oboronia ornata vestalis (Aurivillius, 1895)
Oboronia pseudopunctatus (Strand, 1912)
Oboronia punctatus (Dewitz, 1879)
Chilades naidina (Butler, 1886)
Lepidochrysops anerius kiellandi Stempffer, 1972
Lepidochrysops chala Kielland, 1980
Lepidochrysops chloauges (Bethune-Baker, [1923])
Lepidochrysops cinerea (Bethune-Baker, [1923])
Lepidochrysops cupreus (Neave, 1910)
Lepidochrysops desmondi Stempffer, 1951
Lepidochrysops dollmani (Bethune-Baker, [1923])
Lepidochrysops glauca (Trimen & Bowker, 1887)
Lepidochrysops intermedia cottrelli Stempffer, 1954
Lepidochrysops inyangae (Pinhey, 1945)
Lepidochrysops jansei van Someren, 1957
Lepidochrysops kennethi Kielland, 1986 (endemic)
Lepidochrysops kilimanjarensis (Strand, 1909) (endemic)
Lepidochrysops koaena (Strand, 1911) (endemic)
Lepidochrysops kocak Seven, 1997
Lepidochrysops loveni (Aurivillius, 1922)
Lepidochrysops lukenia van Someren, 1957
Lepidochrysops mpanda Tite, 1961 (endemic)
Lepidochrysops neonegus (Bethune-Baker, [1923])
Lepidochrysops peculiaris peculiaris (Rogenhofer, 1891)
Lepidochrysops peculiaris hypoleucus (Butler, 1893)
Lepidochrysops plebeia proclus (Hulstaert, 1924)
Lepidochrysops solwezii (Bethune-Baker, [1923])

Riodinidae

Nemeobiinae
Abisara caeca Rebel, 1914
Abisara rutherfordii cyclops Riley, 1932
Abisara rogersi simulacris Riley, 1932
Abisara neavei neavei Riley, 1932
Abisara neavei congdoni Kielland, 1985
Abisara neavei mahale Kielland, 1978
Abisara delicata tanzania Kielland, 1986
Abisara delicata zanzibarica Collins, 1990

Nymphalidae

Libytheinae
Libythea labdaca labdaca Westwood, 1851
Libythea labdaca laius Trimen, 1879

Danainae

Danaini
Danaus chrysippus alcippus (Cramer, 1777)
Danaus chrysippus orientis (Aurivillius, 1909)
Danaus dorippus (Klug, 1845)
Tirumala formosa formosa (Godman, 1880)
Tirumala formosa mercedonia (Karsch, 1894)
Tirumala petiverana (Doubleday, 1847)
Amauris niavius niavius (Linnaeus, 1758)
Amauris niavius dominicanus Trimen, 1879
Amauris tartarea tartarea Mabille, 1876
Amauris tartarea damoclides Staudinger, 1896
Amauris tartarea tukuyuensis Kielland, 1990
Amauris albimaculata hanningtoni Butler, 1888
Amauris albimaculata interposita Talbot, 1940
Amauris albimaculata latifascia Talbot, 1940
Amauris albimaculata magnimacula Rebel, 1914
Amauris crawshayi crawshayi Butler, 1897
Amauris crawshayi oscarus Thurau, 1904
Amauris damocles makuyensis Carcasson, 1964
Amauris echeria meruensis Talbot, 1940
Amauris echeria serica Talbot, 1940
Amauris echeria terrena Talbot, 1940
Amauris ellioti altumi van Someren, 1936
Amauris ellioti junia (Le Cerf, 1920)
Amauris hecate (Butler, 1866)
Amauris hyalites Butler, 1874
Amauris inferna uganda Talbot, 1940
Amauris ochlea ochlea (Boisduval, 1847)
Amauris ochlea bumilleri Lanz, 1896
Amauris vashti (Butler, 1869)

Satyrinae

Elymniini
Elymniopsis bammakoo rattrayi (Sharpe, 1902)

Melanitini
Gnophodes betsimena diversa (Butler, 1880)
Gnophodes betsimena parmeno Doubleday, 1849
Gnophodes chelys (Fabricius, 1793)
Melanitis libya Distant, 1882
Aphysoneura pigmentaria pigmentaria Karsch, 1894
Aphysoneura pigmentaria kanga Kielland, 1989
Aphysoneura pigmentaria kiellandi Congdon & Collins, 1998
Aphysoneura pigmentaria mbulu Kielland, 1989
Aphysoneura pigmentaria obnubila Riley, 1923
Aphysoneura pigmentaria semilatilimba Kielland, 1989
Aphysoneura pigmentaria seminigra Kielland, 1985
Aphysoneura pigmentaria songeana Kielland, 1989
Aphysoneura pigmentaria uzungwa Kielland, 1989
Aphysoneura scapulifascia Joicey & Talbot, 1922

Satyrini
Bicyclus angulosa selousi (Trimen, 1895)
Bicyclus anynana (Butler, 1879)
Bicyclus auricruda fulgidus Fox, 1963
Bicyclus buea (Strand, 1912)
Bicyclus campina campina (Aurivillius, 1901)
Bicyclus campina ocelligera (Strand, 1910)
Bicyclus campus (Karsch, 1893)
Bicyclus cooksoni (Druce, 1905)
Bicyclus cottrelli (van Son, 1952)
Bicyclus danckelmani (Rogenhofer, 1891) (endemic)
Bicyclus pareensis Collins & Kielland, 2008
Bicyclus dentata (Sharpe, 1898)
Bicyclus dubia (Aurivillius, 1893)
Bicyclus ena (Hewitson, 1877)
Bicyclus golo (Aurivillius, 1893)
Bicyclus graueri (Rebel, 1914)
Bicyclus hyperanthus (Bethune-Baker, 1908)
Bicyclus ignobilis acutus Condamin, 1965
Bicyclus istaris (Plötz, 1880)
Bicyclus jefferyi Fox, 1963
Bicyclus kenia (Rogenhofer, 1891)
Bicyclus kiellandi Condamin, 1986 (endemic)
Bicyclus mahale Congdon, Kielland & Collins, 1998 (endemic)
Bicyclus mandanes Hewitson, 1873
Bicyclus mesogena ugandae (Riley, 1926)
Bicyclus mollitia (Karsch, 1895)
Bicyclus nachtetis Condamin, 1965
Bicyclus rhacotis (Hewitson, 1866)
Bicyclus safitza (Westwood, 1850)
Bicyclus sambulos sambulos (Hewitson, 1877)
Bicyclus sambulos cyaneus Condamin, 1961
Bicyclus sandace (Hewitson, 1877)
Bicyclus saussurei angustus Condamin, 1970
Bicyclus sebetus (Hewitson, 1877)
Bicyclus similis Condamin, 1963 (endemic)
Bicyclus simulacris simulacris Kielland, 1990
Bicyclus simulacris septentrionalis Kielland, 1990
Bicyclus smithi (Aurivillius, 1899)
Bicyclus sophrosyne (Plötz, 1880)
Bicyclus tanzanicus Condamin, 1986 (endemic)
Bicyclus trilophus jacksoni Condamin, 1961
Bicyclus uzungwensis uzungwensis Kielland, 1990 (endemic)
Bicyclus uzungwensis granti Kielland, 1990 (endemic)
Bicyclus vansoni Condamin, 1965
Bicyclus vulgaris (Butler, 1868)
Bicyclus xeneoides Condamin, 1961
Heteropsis elisi tanzanica (Kielland, 1994)
Heteropsis elisi uluguru (Kielland, 1990)
Heteropsis perspicua (Trimen, 1873)
Heteropsis phaea (Karsch, 1894)
Heteropsis simonsii (Butler, 1877)
Heteropsis teratia (Karsch, 1894)
Heteropsis ubenica ubenica (Thurau, 1903)
Heteropsis ubenica mahale (Kielland, 1994)
Heteropsis ubenica ugandica (Kielland, 1994)
Heteropsis ubenica uzungwa (Kielland, 1994)
Heteropsis peitho gigas (Libert, 2006)
Ypthima albida Butler, 1888
Ypthima antennata van Son, 1955
Ypthima asterope (Klug, 1832)
Ypthima condamini Kielland, 1982
Ypthima doleta Kirby, 1880
Ypthima granulosa Butler, 1883
Ypthima pupillaris obscurata Kielland, 1982
Ypthima recta Overlaet, 1955
Ypthima rhodesiana Carcasson, 1961
Ypthima simplicia Butler, 1876
Ypthimomorpha itonia (Hewitson, 1865)
Mashuna upemba (Overlaet, 1955)
Neocoenyra cooksoni Druce, 1907
Neocoenyra duplex Butler, 1886
Neocoenyra fuligo Kielland, 1990 (endemic)
Neocoenyra fulleborni Thurau, 1903 (endemic)
Neocoenyra heckmanni heckmanni Thurau, 1903 (endemic)
Neocoenyra heckmanni kennethi Kielland, 1990 (endemic)
Neocoenyra heckmanni mangalisa Kielland, 1990 (endemic)
Neocoenyra heckmanni mbinga Kielland, 1990 (endemic)
Neocoenyra heckmanni uzungwae Kielland, 1990 (endemic)
Neocoenyra jordani jordani Rebel, 1906 (endemic)
Neocoenyra jordani septentrionalis Kielland, 1990 (endemic)
Neocoenyra kivuensis Seydel, 1929
Neocoenyra masaica Carcasson, 1958
Neocoenyra paralellopupillata (Karsch, 1897) (endemic)
Neocoenyra petersi Kielland, 1990 (endemic)
Neocoenyra pinheyi Carcasson, 1961 (endemic)
Neocoenyra ypthimoides Butler, 1894
Coenyropsis bera (Hewitson, 1877)
Coenyropsis carcassoni Kielland, 1976
Physcaeneura jacksoni Carcasson, 1961 (endemic)
Physcaeneura leda (Gerstaecker, 1871)
Physcaeneura pione Godman, 1880
Physcaeneura robertsi Kielland, 1990 (endemic)
Neita orbipalus orbipalus Kielland, 1990 (endemic)
Neita orbipalus congdoni Kielland, 1990 (endemic)
Neita victoriae (Aurivillius, 1899)

Charaxinae

Charaxini
Charaxes varanes vologeses (Mabille, 1876)
Charaxes fulvescens monitor Rothschild, 1900
Charaxes acuminatus acuminatus Thurau, 1903
Charaxes acuminatus kigezia van Someren, 1963
Charaxes acuminatus rondonis Kielland, 1987
Charaxes acuminatus teitensis van Someren, 1963
Charaxes acuminatus usambarensis van Someren, 1963
Charaxes candiope (Godart, 1824)
Charaxes protoclea azota (Hewitson, 1877)
Charaxes protoclea catenaria Rousseau-Decelle, 1934
Charaxes protoclea nothodes Jordan, 1911
Charaxes macclounii Butler, 1895
Charaxes lasti lasti Grose-Smith, 1889
Charaxes lasti kimbozae Kielland, 1984
Charaxes lasti magomberae Kielland, 1984
Charaxes cynthia mukuyu van Someren, 1969
Charaxes cynthia parvicaudatus Lathy, 1925
Charaxes lucretius maximus van Someren, 1971
Charaxes jasius harrisoni Sharpe, 1904
Charaxes jasius saturnus Butler, 1866
Charaxes hansali baringana Rothschild, 1905
Charaxes castor castor (Cramer, 1775)
Charaxes castor arthuri van Someren, 1971
Charaxes castor flavifasciatus Butler, 1895
Charaxes brutus alcyone Stoneham, 1943
Charaxes brutus angustus Rothschild, 1900
Charaxes brutus natalensis Staudinger, 1885
Charaxes brutus roberti Turlin, 1987
Charaxes ansorgei kilimanjarica van Someren, 1967
Charaxes ansorgei kungwensis van Someren, 1967
Charaxes ansorgei levicki Poulton, 1933
Charaxes ansorgei loita Plantrou, 1982
Charaxes ansorgei rydoni van Someren, 1967
Charaxes ansorgei simoni Turlin, 1987
Charaxes ansorgei ufipa Kielland, 1978
Charaxes pollux pollux (Cramer, 1775)
Charaxes pollux geminus Rothschild, 1900
Charaxes pollux maua van Someren, 1967
Charaxes pollux mira Ackery, 1995
Charaxes pollux piersoni Collins, 1990
Charaxes druceanus praestans Turlin, 1989
Charaxes druceanus proximans Joicey & Talbot, 1922
Charaxes druceanus septentrionalis Lathy, 1925
Charaxes druceanus teita van Someren, 1939
Charaxes eudoxus katerae Carpenter, 1937
Charaxes eudoxus mechowi Rothschild, 1900
Charaxes eudoxus raffaellae Plantrou, 1982
Charaxes lucyae lucyae van Someren, 1975 (endemic)
Charaxes lucyae gabriellae Turlin & Chovet, 1987 (endemic)
Charaxes lucyae mwanihanae Kielland, 1982 (endemic)
Charaxes richelmanni scheveni Ackery, 1995
Charaxes numenes aequatorialis van Someren, 1972
Charaxes tiridates tiridatinus Röber, 1936
Charaxes bipunctatus ugandensis van Someren, 1972
Charaxes mixtus tanzanicus Kielland, 1988
Charaxes bohemani Felder & Felder, 1859
Charaxes smaragdalis homonymus Bryk, 1939
Charaxes smaragdalis kagera van Someren, 1964
Charaxes smaragdalis kigoma van Someren, 1964
Charaxes xiphares brevicaudatus Schultze, 1914
Charaxes xiphares kiellandi Plantrou, 1976
Charaxes xiphares kilimensis van Someren, 1972
Charaxes xiphares maudei Joicey & Talbot, 1918
Charaxes xiphares nguru Collins, 1989
Charaxes xiphares sitebi Plantrou, 1981
Charaxes xiphares walwandi Collins, 1989
Charaxes cithaeron cithaeron Felder & Felder, 1859
Charaxes cithaeron joanae van Someren, 1964
Charaxes cithaeron kennethi Poulton, 1926
Charaxes violetta maritima van Someren, 1966
Charaxes violetta melloni Fox, 1963
Charaxes imperialis graziellae Turlin, 1989
Charaxes imperialis lisomboensis van Someren, 1975
Charaxes ameliae amelina Joicey & Talbot, 1925
Charaxes ameliae victoriae van Someren, 1972
Charaxes pythodoris pythodoris Hewitson, 1873
Charaxes pythodoris nesaea Grose-Smith, 1889
Charaxes pythodoris pallida van Someren, 1963
Charaxes zingha (Stoll, 1780)
Charaxes etesipe etesipe (Godart, 1824)
Charaxes etesipe pemba van Someren, 1966
Charaxes etesipe shaba Berger, 1981
Charaxes etesipe tavetensis Rothschild, 1894
Charaxes penricei penricei Rothschild, 1900
Charaxes penricei tanganyikae van Someren, 1966
Charaxes achaemenes Felder & Felder, 1867
Charaxes jahlusa argynnides Westwood, 1864
Charaxes jahlusa kenyensis Joicey & Talbot, 1925
Charaxes jahlusa kigomaensis van Someren, 1975
Charaxes jahlusa mafiae Turlin & Lequeux, 1992
Charaxes jahlusa rwandensis Plantrou, 1976
Charaxes eupale latimargo Joicey & Talbot, 1921
Charaxes eupale veneris White & Grant, 1989
Charaxes dilutus dilutus Rothschild, 1898
Charaxes dilutus amanica Collins, 1990
Charaxes anticlea adusta Rothschild, 1900
Charaxes baumanni baumanni Rogenhofer, 1891
Charaxes baumanni granti Turlin, 1989
Charaxes baumanni interposita van Someren, 1971
Charaxes baumanni tenuis van Someren, 1971
Charaxes baumanni whytei Butler, 1894
Charaxes blanda Rothschild, 1897
Charaxes catachrous van Someren & Jackson, 1952
Charaxes etheocles carpenteri van Someren & Jackson, 1957
Charaxes margaretae Rydon, 1980
Charaxes chintechi van Someren, 1975
Charaxes howarthi , 1976
Charaxes phaeus Hewitson, 1877
Charaxes fionae Henning, 1977
Charaxes kirki Butler, 1881
Charaxes berkeleyi berkeleyi van Someren & Jackson, 1957
Charaxes berkeleyi marci Congdon & Collins, 1998
Charaxes aubyni aubyni van Someren & Jackson, 1952
Charaxes aubyni australis van Someren & Jackson, 1957
Charaxes contrarius van Someren, 1969
Charaxes pembanus Jordan, 1925 (endemic)
Charaxes usambarae usambarae van Someren & Jackson, 1952 (endemic)
Charaxes usambarae maridadi Collins, 1987 (endemic)
Charaxes guderiana (Dewitz, 1879)
Charaxes pleione bebra Rothschild, 1900
Charaxes zoolina zoolina (Westwood, [1850])
Charaxes zoolina mafugensis Jackson, 1956
Charaxes nichetes leoninus Butler, 1895
Charaxes nichetes pantherinus Rousseau-Decelle, 1934
Charaxes lycurgus bernardiana Plantrou, 1978
Charaxes zelica toyoshimai Carcasson, 1964
Charaxes porthos dummeri Joicey & Talbot, 1922
Charaxes doubledayi Aurivillius, 1899
Charaxes gerdae Rydon, 1989
Charaxes phenix phenix Turlin & Lequeux, 1993 (endemic)
Charaxes phenix daniellae White, 1996 (endemic)
Charaxes prettejohni Collins, 1990 (endemic)
Charaxes chunguensis White & Grant, 1986 (endemic)
Charaxes grahamei van Someren, 19696 (endemic)
Charaxes mccleeryi van Someren, 1972 (endemic)

Euxanthini
Charaxes crossleyi ansorgei (Rothschild, 1903)
Charaxes crossleyi magnifica (Rebel, 1914)
Charaxes wakefieldi (Ward, 1873)
Charaxes tiberius (Grose-Smith, 1889)

Pallini
Palla publius kigoma van Someren, 1975
Palla ussheri interposita Joicey & Talbot, 1925

Apaturinae
Apaturopsis cleochares cleochares (Hewitson, 1873)
Apaturopsis cleochares schultzei Schmidt, 1921

Nymphalinae
Kallimoides rumia rattrayi (Sharpe, 1904)
Vanessula milca latifasciata Joicey & Talbot, 1928

Nymphalini
Antanartia delius (Drury, 1782)
Antanartia schaeneia dubia Howarth, 1966
Vanessa dimorphica (Howarth, 1966)
Vanessa abyssinica jacksoni Howarth, 1966
Vanessa cardui (Linnaeus, 1758)
Junonia artaxia Hewitson, 1864
Junonia chorimene (Guérin-Méneville, 1844)
Junonia hierta cebrene Trimen, 1870
Junonia natalica (Felder & Felder, 1860)
Junonia oenone (Linnaeus, 1758)
Junonia orithya madagascariensis Guenée, 1865
Junonia sophia infracta Butler, 1888
Junonia gregorii Butler, 1896
Junonia terea elgiva Hewitson, 1864
Junonia terea tereoides (Butler, 1901)
Junonia touhilimasa Vuillot, 1892
Junonia westermanni splendens (Schmidt, 1921)
Junonia westermanni suffusa (Rothschild & Jordan, 1903)
Junonia ansorgei (Rothschild, 1899)
Junonia cymodoce lugens (Schultze, 1912)
Salamis cacta cacta (Fabricius, 1793)
Salamis cacta amaniensis Vosseler, 1907
Protogoniomorpha anacardii nebulosa (Trimen, 1881)
Protogoniomorpha parhassus (Drury, 1782)
Protogoniomorpha temora temora (Felder & Felder, 1867)
Protogoniomorpha temora virescens (Suffert, 1904)
Precis actia Distant, 1880
Precis antilope (Feisthamel, 1850)
Precis ceryne (Boisduval, 1847)
Precis cuama (Hewitson, 1864)
Precis limnoria taveta Rogenhofer, 1891
Precis pelarga (Fabricius, 1775)
Precis rauana (Grose-Smith, 1898)
Precis sinuata sinuata Plötz, 1880
Precis sinuata hecqui Berger, 1981
Precis tugela aurorina (Butler, 1894)
Precis tugela pyriformis (Butler, 1896)
Hypolimnas antevorta (Distant, 1880) (endemic)
Hypolimnas anthedon anthedon (Doubleday, 1845)
Hypolimnas anthedon wahlbergi (Wallengren, 1857)
Hypolimnas deceptor (Trimen, 1873)
Hypolimnas dinarcha grandis Rothschild, 1918
Hypolimnas misippus (Linnaeus, 1764)
Hypolimnas monteironis major Rothschild, 1918
Hypolimnas salmacis magnifica Rothschild, 1918
Hypolimnas usambara (Ward, 1872)
Catacroptera cloanthe (Stoll, 1781)

Cyrestinae

Cyrestini
Cyrestis camillus camillus (Fabricius, 1781)
Cyrestis camillus sublineata Lathy, 1901

Biblidinae

Biblidini
Byblia anvatara acheloia (Wallengren, 1857)
Byblia anvatara crameri Aurivillius, 1894
Byblia ilithyia (Drury, 1773)
Mesoxantha ethosea reducta Rothschild, 1918
Ariadne enotrea archeri Carcasson, 1958
Ariadne enotrea suffusa (Joicey & Talbot, 1921)
Ariadne pagenstecheri (Suffert, 1904)
Neptidopsis fulgurata platyptera Rothschild & Jordan, 1903
Neptidopsis ophione nucleata Grünberg, 1911
Eurytela dryope angulata Aurivillius, 1899
Eurytela hiarbas hiarbas (Drury, 1782)
Eurytela hiarbas lita Rothschild & Jordan, 1903

Epicaliini
Sevenia amulia benguelae (Chapman, 1872)
Sevenia boisduvali boisduvali (Wallengren, 1857)
Sevenia boisduvali omissa (Rothschild, 1918)
Sevenia dubiosa (Strand, 1911)
Sevenia garega (Karsch, 1892)
Sevenia morantii (Trimen, 1881)
Sevenia natalensis (Boisduval, 1847)
Sevenia occidentalium (Mabille, 1876)
Sevenia pechueli rhodesiana (Rothschild, 1918)
Sevenia pseudotrimeni (Kielland, 1985) (endemic)
Sevenia rosa (Hewitson, 1877)
Sevenia umbrina (Karsch, 1892)

Limenitinae

Limenitidini
Harma theobene blassi (Weymer, 1892)
Harma theobene superna (Fox, 1968)
Cymothoe amaniensis Rydon, 1980 (endemic)
Cymothoe aurivillii aurivillii Staudinger, 1899 (endemic)
Cymothoe aurivillii handeni Rydon, 1996 (endemic)
Cymothoe aurivillii latifasciata Rydon, 1996 (endemic)
Cymothoe aurivillii nguru Rydon, 1996 (endemic)
Cymothoe aurivillii tenuifasciae Rydon, 1996 (endemic)
Cymothoe caenis (Drury, 1773)
Cymothoe collinsi Rydon, 1980 (endemic)
Cymothoe coranus coranus Grose-Smith, 1889
Cymothoe coranus kiellandi Beaurain, 1988
Cymothoe cottrelli cottrelli Rydon, 1980
Cymothoe cottrelli njombe Rydon, 1996
Cymothoe confusa Aurivillius, 1887
Cymothoe herminia johnstoni (Butler, 1902)
Cymothoe hobarti hobarti Butler, 1900
Cymothoe hobarti lactanganyikae Collins, 1990
Cymothoe lurida azumai Carcasson, 1964
Cymothoe lurida butleri Grünberg, 1908
Cymothoe magambae magambae Rydon, 1980 (endemic)
Cymothoe magambae pareensis Rydon, 1996 (endemic)
Pseudoneptis bugandensis Stoneham, 1935
Pseudacraea boisduvalii boisduvalii (Doubleday, 1845)
Pseudacraea boisduvalii pemba Kielland, 1990
Pseudacraea boisduvalii trimenii Butler, 1874
Pseudacraea deludens amaurina Neustetter, 1928
Pseudacraea deludens morogoro Kielland, 1990
Pseudacraea deludens reducta Kielland, 1990
Pseudacraea deludens tanganyikae Kielland, 1990
Pseudacraea dolomena usagarae Staudinger, 1891
Pseudacraea eurytus eurytus (Linnaeus, 1758)
Pseudacraea eurytus conradti Oberthür, 1893
Pseudacraea lucretia expansa (Butler, 1878)
Pseudacraea poggei (Dewitz, 1879)
Pseudacraea semire (Cramer, 1779)

Neptidini
Neptis agouale agouale Pierre-Baltus, 1978
Neptis agouale parallela Collins & Larsen, 1996
Neptis alta Overlaet, 1955
Neptis aurivillii aurivillii Schultze, 1913
Neptis aurivillii ufipa Kielland, 1990
Neptis carcassoni Van Son, 1959
Neptis carpenteri d'Abrera, 1980
Neptis clarei Neave, 1904
Neptis conspicua Neave, 1904
Neptis constantiae Carcasson, 1961
Neptis angusta Condamin, 1966
Neptis exaleuca suffusa Rothschild, 1918
Neptis goochii Trimen, 1879
Neptis gratiosa Overlaet, 1955
Neptis incongrua incongrua Butler, 1896
Neptis incongrua isidoro Kielland, 1985
Neptis incongrua nguru Kielland, 1987
Neptis jordani Neave, 1910
Neptis kikuyuensis Jackson, 1951
Neptis kiriakoffi Overlaet, 1955
Neptis livingstonei Suffert, 1904 (endemic)
Neptis metella (Doubleday, 1848)
Neptis morosa Overlaet, 1955
Neptis nemetes margueriteae Fox, 1968
Neptis nicobule Holland, 1892
Neptis nicoteles Hewitson, 1874
Neptis nina Staudinger, 1896
Neptis occidentalis Rothschild, 1918
Neptis ochracea ochracea Neave, 1904
Neptis ochracea reductata Larsen, 1995
Neptis ochracea uluguru Kielland, 1985
Neptis penningtoni van Son, 1977
Neptis puella Aurivillius, 1894
Neptis rogersi Eltringham, 1921
Neptis serena Overlaet, 1955
Neptis strigata kakamega Collins & Larsen, 1996
Neptis trigonophora trigonophora Butler, 1878
Neptis trigonophora melicertula Strand, 1912

Adoliadini
Catuna angustatum (Felder & Felder, 1867)
Catuna crithea (Drury, 1773)
Catuna oberthueri Karsch, 1894
Catuna sikorana Rogenhofer, 1889
Euryphura achlys (Hopffer, 1855)
Euryphura chalcis chalcis (Felder & Felder, 1860)
Euryphura chalcis kiellandi Hecq, 1990
Euryphura concordia (Hopffer, 1855)
Pseudargynnis hegemone (Godart, 1819)
Aterica galene extensa Heron, 1909
Aterica galene theophane Hopffer, 1855
Cynandra opis bernardii Lagnel, 1967
Euriphene conjungens kiellandi Hecq, 1994
Euriphene iris (Aurivillius, 1903)
Euriphene obsoleta munene Hecq, 1994
Euriphene ribensis (Ward, 1871)
Euriphene saphirina saphirina (Karsch, 1894)
Euriphene saphirina itanii (Carcasson, 1964)
Euriphene saphirina memoria Hecq, 1994
Euriphene tadema nigropunctata (Aurivillius, 1901)
Bebearia carshena (Hewitson, 1871)
Bebearia absolon entebbiae (Lathy, 1906)
Bebearia cocalia badiana (Rbel, 1914)
Bebearia cocalia katera (van Someren, 1939)
Bebearia orientis orientis (Karsch, 1895)
Bebearia orientis insularis Kielland, 1985
Bebearia sophus audeoudi (Riley, 1936)
Bebearia sophus ochreata (Carcasson, 1961)
Bebearia plistonax (Hewitson, 1874)
Bebearia phantasiella simulata (van Someren, 1939)
Bebearia chriemhilda (Staudinger, 1896)
Bebearia kiellandi Hecq, 1993 (endemic)
Euphaedra medon innotata Holland, 1920
Euphaedra medon neustetteri Niepelt, 1915
Euphaedra zaddachii crawshayi Butler, 1895
Euphaedra hollandi Hecq, 1974
Euphaedra diffusa Gaede, 1916
Euphaedra phosphor Joicey & Talbot, 1921
Euphaedra uganda minzuru Hecq, 1992
Euphaedra paradoxa Neave, 1904
Euphaedra alacris Hecq, 1978
Euphaedra cooksoni Druce, 1905
Euphaedra confina Hecq, 1992 (endemic)
Euphaedra castanoides Hecq, 1985
Euphaedra orientalis Rothschild, 1898
Euphaedra ruspina (Hewitson, 1865)
Euphaedra harpalyce spatiosa (Mabille, 1876)
Euphaedra neophron neophron (Hopffer, 1855)
Euphaedra neophron littoralis Talbot, 1929
Euphaedra neophron violaceae (Butler, 1888)
Euphaedra neophron kiellandi Hecq, 1985
Euphaedra neophron rydoni Howarth, 1969
Euptera elabontas elabontas (Hewitson, 1871)
Euptera elabontas mweruensis Neave, 1910
Euptera hirundo lufirensis Joicey & Talbot, 1921
Euptera kinugnana (Grose-Smith, 1889)
Pseudathyma cyrili Chovet, 2002
Pseudathyma lucretioides rondo Kielland, 1987
Pseudathyma plutonica plutonica Butler, 1902
Pseudathyma plutonica expansa Kielland, 1978
Pseudathyma uluguru uluguru Kielland, 1985 (endemic)
Pseudathyma uluguru abriana Collins, 2002 (endemic)

Heliconiinae

Acraeini
Acraea cerasa cerasa Hewitson, 1861
Acraea cerasa cerita Sharpe, 1906
Acraea cerasa kiellandi Carcasson, 1964
Acraea acara Hewitson, 1865
Acraea anemosa Hewitson, 1865
Acraea boopis ama Pierre, 1979
Acraea chilo Godman, 1880
Acraea cuva Grose-Smith, 1889
Acraea endoscota Le Doux, 1928
Acraea hamata Joicey & Talbot, 1922
Acraea insignis Distant, 1880
Acraea kappa Pierre, 1979 (endemic)
Acraea leucographa Ribbe, 1889
Acraea machequena Grose-Smith, 1887
Acraea neobule Doubleday, 1847
Acraea pseudolycia astrigera Butler, 1899
Acraea punctimarginea Pinhey, 1956 (endemic)
Acraea quirina quirina (Fabricius, 1781)
Acraea quirina rosa Eltringham, 1912
Acraea rabbaiae Ward, 1873
Acraea satis Ward, 1871
Acraea zonata Hewitson, 1877
Acraea acrita Hewitson, 1865
Acraea asema Hewitson, 1877
Acraea bergeriana Pierre, 1979 (endemic)
Acraea chaeribula Oberthür, 1893
Acraea egina areca Mabille, 1889
Acraea egina pembanus Kielland, 1990
Acraea guillemei Oberthür, 1893
Acraea manca Thurau, 1904 (endemic)
Acraea periphanes Oberthür, 1893
Acraea petraea Boisduval, 1847
Acraea pudorina Staudinger, 1885
Acraea punctellata Eltringham, 1912
Acraea rohlfsi Suffert, 1904 (endemic)
Acraea utengulensis Thurau, 1903
Acraea asboloplintha Karsch, 1894
Acraea braesia Godman, 1885
Acraea caecilia caecilia (Fabricius, 1781)
Acraea caecilia pudora Aurivillius, 1910
Acraea caldarena caldarena Hewitson, 1877
Acraea caldarena neluska Oberthür, 1878
Acraea equatorialis equatorialis Neave, 1904
Acraea equatorialis anaemia Eltringham, 1912
Acraea leucopyga Aurivillius, 1904
Acraea lygus Druce, 1875
Acraea natalica Boisduval, 1847
Acraea pseudegina Westwood, 1852
Acraea pudorella Aurivillius, 1899
Acraea stenobea Wallengren, 1860
Acraea sykesi Sharpe, 1902
Acraea kia Pierre, 1990 (endemic)
Acraea adrasta Weymer, 1892
Acraea aganice montana (Butler, 1888)
Acraea aganice nicega (Suffert, 1904)
Acraea alcinoe camerunica (Aurivillius, 1893)
Acraea consanguinea albicolor (Karsch, 1895)
Acraea epaea epaea (Cramer, 1779)
Acraea epaea epitellus Staudinger, 1896
Acraea epaea melina (Thurau, 1903)
Acraea epaea paragea (Grose-Smith, 1900)
Acraea epiprotea (Butler, 1874)
Acraea macarista (Sharpe, 1906)
Acraea poggei poggei Dewitz, 1879
Acraea poggei nelsoni Grose-Smith & Kirby, 1892
Acraea quadricolor quadricolor (Rogenhofer, 1891)
Acraea quadricolor itumbana (Jordan, 1910)
Acraea quadricolor latifasciata (Sharpe, 1892)
Acraea quadricolor leptis (Jordan, 1910)
Acraea quadricolor mahale (Kielland, 1990)
Acraea quadricolor morogoro (Carpenter & Jackson, 1950)
Acraea quadricolor uluguru (Kielland, 1990)
Acraea scalivittata scalivittata (Butler, 1896)
Acraea scalivittata kiellandianus Koçak, 1996
Acraea tellus eumelis (Jordan, 1910)
Acraea umbra macarioides (Aurivillius, 1893)
Acraea vestalis congoensis (Le Doux, 1937)
Acraea acerata Hewitson, 1874
Acraea acuta Howarth, 1969
Acraea ngorongoro Kielland, 1990
Acraea nigromaculata Kielland, 1990
Acraea rubrobasalis Kielland, 1990
Acraea alciopoides Joicey & Talbot, 1921
Acraea alicia alicia (Sharpe, 1890)
Acraea alicia mbulu Kielland, 1990
Acraea alicia uzungwae Kielland, 1990
Acraea althoffi neavei Poulton, 1924
Acraea amicitiae Heron, 1909
Acraea aurivillii Staudinger, 1896
Acraea baxteri baxteri Sharpe, 1902
Acraea baxteri oldeani Kielland, 1990
Acraea baxteri subsquamia Thurau, 1903
Acraea bonasia (Fabricius, 1775)
Acraea cabira Hopffer, 1855
Acraea encedana Pierre, 1976
Acraea serena (Fabricius, 1775)
Acraea esebria Hewitson, 1861
Acraea excelsior Sharpe, 1891
Acraea goetzei Thurau, 1903
Acraea humilis Sharpe, 1897
Acraea iturina Grose-Smith, 1890
Acraea johnstoni Godman, 1885
Acraea kalinzu Carpenter, 1936
Acraea lycoa Godart, 1819
Acraea oberthueri Butler, 1895
Acraea orestia orestia Hewitson, 1874
Acraea orestia sambar Stoneham, 1943
Acraea pentapolis epidica Oberthür, 1893
Acraea pharsalus pharsalus Ward, 1871
Acraea pharsalus pharsaloides Holland, 1892
Acraea sotikensis Sharpe, 1892
Acraea ventura ventura Hewitson, 1877
Acraea ventura ochrascens Sharpe, 1902
Acraea viviana Staudinger, 1896
Acraea vuilloti Mabille, 1889 (endemic)
Acraea bomba Grose-Smith, 1889
Acraea lusinga Overlaet, 1955
Acraea rahira rahira Boisduval, 1833
Acraea rahira mufindi Kielland, 1990
Acraea aubyni Eltringham, 1912
Acraea cinerea Neave, 1904
Acraea conradti Oberthür, 1893
Acraea igola Trimen & Bowker, 1889
Acraea ntebiae ntebiae Sharpe, 1897
Acraea ntebiae kigoma Kielland, 1978
Acraea oreas Sharpe, 1891
Acraea orinata Oberthür, 1893
Acraea parrhasia orientis Aurivillius, 1904
Acraea penelope Staudinger, 1896
Acraea perenna thesprio Oberthür, 1893
Acraea quirinalis Grose-Smith, 1900
Acraea semivitrea Aurivillius, 1895
Acraea kuekenthali Le Doux, 1922
Acraea lyci Pierre, 2006 (endemic)

Argynnini
Issoria smaragdifera reducta Carcasson, 1961
Issoria baumanni katangae (Neave, 1910)
Issoria baumanni orientalis Kielland, 1990
Issoria hanningtoni (Elwes, 1889)

Vagrantini
Lachnoptera anticlia (Hübner, 1819)
Lachnoptera ayresii Trimen, 1879
Phalanta eurytis (Doubleday, 1847)
Phalanta phalantha aethiopica (Rothschild & Jordan, 1903)

Hesperiidae

Coeliadinae
Coeliades anchises (Gerstaecker, 1871)
Coeliades chalybe (Westwood, 1852)
Coeliades forestan (Stoll, [1782])
Coeliades hanno (Plötz, 1879)
Coeliades keithloa kenya Evans, 1937
Coeliades pisistratus (Fabricius, 1793)
Coeliades sejuncta (Mabille & Vuillot, 1891)

Pyrginae

Celaenorrhinini
Celaenorrhinus bettoni Butler, 1902
Celaenorrhinus boadicea howarthi Berger, 1976
Celaenorrhinus cordeironis Kielland, 1992 (endemic)
Celaenorrhinus galenus biseriata (Butler, 1888)
Celaenorrhinus handmani Collins & Congdon, 1998
Celaenorrhinus homeyeri (Plötz, 1880)
Celaenorrhinus intermixtus evansi Berger, 1975
Celaenorrhinus kimboza Evans, 1949 (endemic)
Celaenorrhinus meditrina (Hewitson, 1877)
Celaenorrhinus perlustris Rebel, 1914
Celaenorrhinus proxima (Mabille, 1877)
Celaenorrhinus rubeho Kielland, 1990 (endemic)
Celaenorrhinus sanjeensis Kielland, 1990 (endemic)
Celaenorrhinus uluguru Kielland, 1990 (endemic)
Celaenorrhinus zanqua Evans, 1937
Eretis djaelaelae (Wallengren, 1857)
Eretis herewardi Riley, 1921
Eretis lugens (Rogenhofer, 1891)
Eretis melania Mabille, 1891
Eretis mitiana Evans, 1937
Eretis umbra maculifera Mabille & Boullet, 1916
Eretis vaga Evans, 1937
Sarangesa astrigera Butler, 1894
Sarangesa aza Evans, 1951
Sarangesa bouvieri (Mabille, 1877)
Sarangesa brigida atra Evans, 1937
Sarangesa haplopa Swinhoe, 1907
Sarangesa laelius (Mabille, 1877)
Sarangesa maculata (Mabille, 1891)
Sarangesa phidyle (Walker, 1870)
Sarangesa princei Karsch, 1896
Sarangesa ruona Evans, 1937
Sarangesa thecla mabira Evans, 1956
Sarangesa tricerata compacta Evans, 1951

Tagiadini
Tagiades flesus (Fabricius, 1781)
Eagris decastigma purpura Evans, 1937
Eagris lucetia (Hewitson, 1875)
Eagris nottoana (Wallengren, 1857)
Eagris sabadius astoria Holland, 1896
Eagris sabadius ochreana Lathy, 1901
Calleagris hollandi (Butler, 1897)
Calleagris jamesoni jamesoni (Sharpe, 1890)
Calleagris jamesoni jacksoni Evans, 1951
Calleagris lacteus (Mabille, 1877)
Netrobalane canopus (Trimen, 1864)
Leucochitonea amneris (Rebel & Rogenhofer, 1894) (endemic)
Abantis arctomarginata Lathy, 1901
Abantis bamptoni Collins & Larsen, 1994
Abantis leucogaster iruma Evans, 1951
Abantis paradisea (Butler, 1870)
Abantis tettensis Hopffer, 1855
Abantis venosa Trimen & Bowker, 1889
Abantis zambesiaca (Westwood, 1874)

Carcharodini
Spialia colotes transvaaliae (Trimen & Bowker, 1889)
Spialia confusa confusa Evans, 1937
Spialia confusa obscura Evans, 1937
Spialia depauperata (Strand, 1911)
Spialia mafa higginsi Evans, 1937
Spialia ploetzi (Aurivillius, 1891)
Spialia secessus (Trimen, 1891)
Spialia zebra bifida (Higgins, 1924)

Hesperiinae

Aeromachini
Astictopterus bruno (Evans, 1937) (endemic)
Astictopterus punctulata (Butler, 1895)
Astictopterus stellata amania Evans, 1947
Astictopterus stellata mineni (Trimen, 1894)
Astictopterus tura Evans, 1951 (endemic)
Prosopalpus debilis (Plötz, 1879)
Prosopalpus saga Evans, 1937
Prosopalpus styla Evans, 1937
Ampittia capenas (Hewitson, 1868)
Ampittia parva Aurivillius, 1925 (endemic)
Ampittia kilombero Larsen & Congdon, 2012
Kedestes barberae (Trimen, 1873)
Kedestes brunneostriga (Plötz, 1884)
Kedestes callicles (Hewitson, 1868)
Kedestes mohozutza (Wallengren, 1857)
Kedestes nerva paola Plötz, 1884
Kedestes protensa Butler, 1901
Kedestes rogersi Druce, 1907
Kedestes wallengrenii (Trimen, 1883)
Kedestes fenestratus (Butler, 1894)
Gorgyra afikpo Druce, 1909
Gorgyra aretina (Hewitson, 1878)
Gorgyra bibulus Riley, 1929
Gorgyra bina Evans, 1937
Gorgyra diva Evans, 1937
Gorgyra johnstoni (Butler, 1894)
Gorgyra kalinzu Evans, 1949
Gorgyra mocquerysii Holland, 1896
Gorgyra vosseleri Grünberg, 1907 (endemic)
Gorgyra subflavidus Holland, 1896
Teniorhinus harona (Westwood, 1881)
Teniorhinus herilus (Hopffer, 1855)
Teniorhinus ignita (Mabille, 1877)
Ceratrichia bonga Evans, 1947 (endemic)
Ceratrichia brunnea Bethune-Baker, 1906
Ceratrichia clara medea Evans, 1937
Ceratrichia hollandi Bethune-Baker, 1908
Ceratrichia mabirensis Riley, 1925
Ceratrichia semilutea Mabille, 1891
Ceratrichia semlikensis Joicey & Talbot, 1921
Ceratrichia wollastoni Heron, 1909
Pardaleodes bule Holland, 1896
Pardaleodes fan (Holland, 1894)
Pardaleodes incerta (Snellen, 1872)
Pardaleodes sator pusiella Mabille, 1877
Xanthodisca vibius (Hewitson, 1878)
Acada biseriata (Mabille, 1893)
Osmodes adon (Mabille, 1890)
Osmodes adonia Evans, 1937
Osmodes adosus (Mabille, 1890)
Osmodes banghaasii Holland, 1896
Osmodes costatus Aurivillius, 1896
Osmodes distincta Holland, 1896
Osmodes hollandi Evans, 1937
Osmodes omar Swinhoe, 1916
Osmodes thora (Plötz, 1884)
Parosmodes morantii morantii (Trimen, 1873)
Parosmodes morantii axis Evans, 1937
Paracleros biguttulus (Mabille, 1890)
Paracleros sangoanus (Carcasson, 1964)
Paracleros substrigata (Holland, 1893)
Acleros mackenii instabilis Mabille, 1890
Acleros neavei Evans, 1937
Acleros nigrapex Strand, 1913
Acleros ploetzi Mabille, 1890
Semalea arela (Mabille, 1891)
Semalea pulvina (Plötz, 1879)
Semalea sextilis (Plötz, 1886)
Hypoleucis ophiusa ophir Evans, 1937
Meza cybeutes (Holland, 1894)
Meza larea (Neave, 1910)
Paronymus budonga (Evans, 1938)
Paronymus xanthias kiellandi Congdon & Collins, 1998
Andronymus bjornstadi Congdon, Kielland & Collins, 1998 (endemic)
Andronymus caesar philander (Hopffer, 1855)
Andronymus gander Evans, 1947
Andronymus hero Evans, 1937
Andronymus neander (Plötz, 1884)
Chondrolepis niveicornis (Plötz, 1883)
Chondrolepis obscurior de Jong, 1986 (endemic)
Chondrolepis uluguru Larsen & Congdon, 2012
Chondrolepis similis de Jong, 1986 (endemic)
Chondrolepis telisignata (Butler, 1896)
Chondrolepis uluguru T.B. Larsen & Congdon, 2012
Zophopetes ganda Evans, 1937
Zophopetes nobilior (Holland, 1896)
Gamia buchholzi (Plötz, 1879)
Gamia shelleyi (Sharpe, 1890)
Artitropa erinnys ehlersi Karsch, 1896
Artitropa milleri Riley, 1925
Artitropa reducta Aurivillius, 1925
Artitropa usambarae Congdon, Kielland, & Collins, 1998 (endemic)
Gretna balenge (Holland, 1891)
Gretna carmen carmen Evans, 1937
Gretna carmen capra Evans, 1937
Gretna cylinda (Hewitson, 1876)
Pteroteinon capronnieri (Plötz, 1879)
Pteroteinon ceucaenira (Druce, 1910)
Pteroteinon concaenira Belcastro & Larsen, 1996
Leona leonora leonora (Plötz, 1879)
Leona leonora dux Evans, 1937
Leona halma Evans, 1937
Leona luehderi laura Evans, 1937
Caenides kangvensis Holland, 1896
Caenides dacela (Hewitson, 1876)
Caenides hidaroides Aurivillius, 1896
Caenides dacena (Hewitson, 1876)
Monza alberti (Holland, 1896)
Monza cretacea (Snellen, 1872)
Monza punctata punctata (Aurivillius, 1910)
Monza punctata crola Evans, 1937
Melphina tarace (Mabille, 1891)
Fresna cojo (Karsch, 1893)
Fresna netopha (Hewitson, 1878)
Fresna nyassae (Hewitson, 1878)
Platylesches affinissima Strand, 1921
Platylesches fosta Evans, 1937
Platylesches galesa (Hewitson, 1877)
Platylesches langa Evans, 1937
Platylesches larseni Kielland, 1992 (endemic)
Platylesches panga Evans, 1937
Platylesches picanini (Holland, 1894)
Platylesches rasta Evans, 1937
Platylesches robustus Neave, 1910

Baorini
Brusa saxicola (Neave, 1910)
Zenonia anax Evans, 1937
Borbo chagwa (Evans, 1937)
Borbo fallax (Gaede, 1916)
Borbo fanta (Evans, 1937)
Borbo ferruginea (Aurivillius, 1925)
Borbo holtzi (Plötz, 1883)
Borbo lugens (Hopffer, 1855)
Borbo perobscura (Druce, 1912)
Borbo sirena (Evans, 1937)

Heteropterinae
Metisella abdeli (Krüger, 1928)
Metisella carsoni (Butler, 1898)
Metisella congdoni de Jong & Kielland, 1983 (endemic)
Metisella decipiens (Butler, 1896)
Metisella formosus linda Evans, 1937
Metisella formosus nyanza Evans, 1937
Metisella kambove (Neave, 1910)
Metisella medea medea Evans, 1937
Metisella medea nyika Evans, 1937
Metisella midas (Butler, 1894)
Metisella perexcellens marunga Evans, 1937
Metisella perexcellens sitebi Kielland, 1982
Metisella quadrisignatus (Butler, 1894)
Metisella trisignatus tanga Evans, 1937
Metisella willemi (Wallengren, 1857)
Tsitana wallacei (Neave, 1910)
Lepella lepeletier (Latreille, 1824)

See also
List of moths of Tanzania
Wildlife of Tanzania

References

Seitz, A. Die Gross-Schmetterlinge der Erde 13: Die Afrikanischen Tagfalter. Plates
Seitz, A. Die Gross-Schmetterlinge der Erde 13: Die Afrikanischen Tagfalter. Text 

Butterflies
Tanzania
Tanzania